Patricia Hidalgo Reina is a broadcasting executive and the current Director of BBC Children's and Education.

BBC Children's
Patricia Hidalgo Reina was announced as the 19th director of BBC Children's and Education on 5 May 2020. Taking over her responsibilities during the COVID-19 epidemic led her to increase the amount of education programming available to children unable to attend school during lockdown. In addition to education provision on the BBC Children's services (CBBC and CBeebies) a commitment was made to make at least two hours of secondary school content each day on BBC 2.

In February 2021 she launched her programme strategy, to invest in British Animation that might match the cultural impact of The Simpsons. "We should be thinking about these things. Children grow up with these cultures. Why not infuse more of our culture?" she has stated.

Earlier career
She began her broadcasting career at Canal+ in Spain.   Moving to The Walt Disney Company in 2008 she managed their channels in Spain and Italy before taking strategic control for all the Disney Channels across EMEA.   In 2013 she was appointed Chief Content and Creative Officer for the Turner network channels across EMEA where along with overseeing their children channels which include Cartoon Network and Cartoonito she was responsible for the production of the animated series, The Amazing World Of Gumball.

Awards
In 2017 she was awarded the World Screen's Global Kids Trendsetter award at MIPCOM in recognition of her outstanding contribution to the Children's' Media industry.

References

BBC 100 Women
BBC executives
BBC television producers
British television producers
Television executives
Women television executives
Year of birth missing (living people)